The 1996 Division Two Championship season was the third tier of British rugby league during the 1996 season, and was also the first season of rugby league to be played in the summer. The competition featured all eleven teams from the 1995–96 Rugby Football League season and an additional newly formed club, South Wales.

Championship
The league was won by Hull Kingston Rovers for a second successive season, winning promotion to Division One along with runners-up Swinton Lions.

League table

Statistics
The following are the top points scorers in Division Two during the 1996 season. Statistics are for league matches only.

Most tries

Most goals

Most points

See also
Super League war
1996 Challenge Cup

References

External links

1996 season at wigan.rlfans.com

RFL League 1
RFL Division Two
RFL Division Two